The Barnstaple by-election was a Parliamentary by-election held on 6 May 1911. It returned one Member of Parliament (MP)  to the House of Commons of the Parliament of the United Kingdom, elected by the first past the post voting system.

Previous result

Candidates
The Liberal candidate was Sir Godfrey Baring, a 40-year-old Eton educated former Liberal MP from the Isle of Wight. He had sat for the Isle of Wight from 1906 until his defeat in January 1910. At the December 1910 general election he had contested Devonport . He was the chairman of the Isle of Wight County Council.

The Unionist candidate was Charles Sandbach Parker, an Ayrshire-based 47-year-old Chairman and Managing Director of Demerara Co. who had been educated at Eton and Oxford. He had contested Barnstaple at the December 1910 general election.

Result

Aftermath
Baring chose not to defend his seat and instead sought re-election for his old Isle of Wight seat.

References

 Craig, F. W. S. (1974). British parliamentary election results 1885-1918 (1 ed.). London: Macmillan. 
 Who's Who: www.ukwhoswho.com 
 Debrett's House of Commons 1916

1911 in England
1911 elections in the United Kingdom
Barnstaple
By-elections to the Parliament of the United Kingdom in Devon constituencies
1910s in Devon